L'Anse Mitan is the name of both a road and a district located east of Moruga in Trinidad and Tobago. It connects Moruga with the La Retrait sea bathing spot. L'anse Mitan Road, at the mouth of the Moruga River, is noted as one of the possible sites at which Christopher Columbus landed in Trinidad and Tobago in 1498.

Populated places in Trinidad and Tobago